The Blackburn House is a historic house at Main and College Streets in Canehill, Arkansas.  It is a -story wood-frame structure, with a cross-gable hip roof and a stone foundation.  The house has the asymmetrical massing and decorative wood shingle siding in its gables that are characteristic of Queen Anne architecture, and shed-roof porch extending across its main facade, supported by box columns.  The porch has a gabled pediment above the stairs leading to the main entrance, and a symmetry more typical of the Colonial Revival.  Built in 1898 by a local doctor, this house is a well-preserved local example of this transitional form.

The house was listed on the National Register of Historic Places in 1988.

See also
National Register of Historic Places listings in Washington County, Arkansas

References

Houses on the National Register of Historic Places in Arkansas
Colonial Revival architecture in Arkansas
Houses completed in 1898
Houses in Washington County, Arkansas
National Register of Historic Places in Washington County, Arkansas
Queen Anne architecture in Arkansas
1898 establishments in Arkansas